Santa Monica 13 or SMG is a Mexican-American street gang located in Santa Monica, California, United States. They reside mainly in the Pico neighborhood. Even though Santa Monica 13 is a Sureño gang, they wear their traditional black bandanas. The acronym SM17 refers to Santa Monica 17th Street, which is the gang's primary subset or "clique". They write up "SMG" or "Santa Monica Gang" to show solidarity.

History 
The Santa Monica Gang was the first gang to originate on the Westside of Los Angeles in the late 1920s, formerly known as the Santa Monica Tomato Patch Gang. They had given birth to all the surrounding gangs in the area. The gang simply became known as Santa Monica 13 and, since the creation of the Mexican Mafia in the 1950s, have been known for their violent ways.

Cliques 
The only active clique remaining in the 17th Street gang are the "Pee Wee Locos", and the only active remaining clique of Santa Monica 13 are the "Little Locos". Other cliques have come and gone over time, including the 11th Street Chavos, 17th Street Tiny Locos, 17th Street Locas, 20th Streeters, 21st. Deadend Winos, Midget Locos and the Crickets.

Graffiti 
The gang's graffiti includes the symbols "SM" "SMG", "SM13" or "SMX3" and for the 17th Street gang, "SM17" or "SMXVII" plus "SMX7" or "SMXV2st".

References

Organizations established in the 1920s
1920s establishments in California
Sureños
Latino street gangs
Gangs in Los Angeles
Mexican-American culture in Los Angeles
Organizations based in Santa Monica, California